Doliolina is a genus of tunicates belonging to the family Doliolidae.

The species of this genus are found in Southern Hemisphere.

Species:

Doliolina indica 
Doliolina intermedia 
Doliolina krohni 
Doliolina muelleri 
Doliolina mulleri 
Doliolina obscura 
Doliolina resistibilis 
Doliolina separata 
Doliolina sigmoides 
Doliolina undulata

References

Tunicates